George Garrett (13 August 1896 Seacombe – 28 May 1966) was a British labour activist, writer and actor. He was a member of the Industrial Workers of the World, and notable working class writer.

Biography
Garrett was born in Seacombe, Cheshire, England, on 13 August 1896. His father, Samuel Garrett, was the son of Irish Protestant migrants. His mother, Catherine McAndrew, was the daughter of Irish Catholic migrants. After marrying in Liverpool in 1891 his Liverpool-born parents moved to Seacombe. Garrett lived most of his life in Liverpool where he is remembered as a labour activist.

Garrett was a merchant seaman, writer, playwright and founder member of the Unity Theatre, Liverpool. He was a radical activist who travelled the world and wrote a series of short stories, plays and pieces of reportage about hunger and unemployment in the 1930s. He was a syndicalist who joined the Industrial Workers of the World when he lived in New York for three years, and was influenced by the Irish American Playwright, Eugene O'Neill.

He died of throat cancer on 28 May 1966.

See also
James Hanley (novelist)
Proletarian fiction

Further reading
The Collected George Garrett, Michael Murphy (Ed.), 1999, Trent Editions,

References

1896 births
1966 deaths
Industrial Workers of the World members
Proletarian literature
Deaths from cancer in England
Place of death missing
Trade unionists from Liverpool